Holly Golightly may refer to:

 Holly Golightly, the main character of Truman Capote's 1958 novella  Breakfast at Tiffany's, the 1961 film adaptation, and the 1966 musical
 Holly Golightly (comics) (born 1964), comic book writer and artist, earlier known as Fauve and Holly G.
 Holly Golightly (singer) (born 1966), British singer-songwriter
 Holly (Golightly), a girl in the novel The Lovely Bones (2002) and its film adaptation